Frontier Nagaland is a region of Indian state of Nagaland. The comprises eastern districts of Nagaland.

History 
Earlier the region was part of Tuensang Frontier Division as part of North-East Frontier Agency(present day Arunachal Pradesh) until 1957. The area was transferred to Naga Hills District of United Assam state until 1962 after which it became part of present day Nagaland. The division was renamed as Tuensang Naga Hills District.

Districts 
The region comprises following districts, 

 Mon district
 Longleng district
 Tuensang district
 Noklak district
 Shamator district
 Kiphire district

Separate state demand
Separate state demand has been raised by an organisation called Eastern Nagaland People's Organisation. They argue that the region which is already economically backward, is further being ignored by the state government and given a step-motherly treatment. The demand has strong support in the region and is based on popular grassroot resolution encompassing every village council and tribal council of Eastern Nagaland. ENPO delegation has met the Union Home Minister Amit Shah who said that the grievances and request for a seperate entity is understood. After  several high level meetings between ENPO and the Government of India, the MHA has agreed to offer a 'Frontier Naga Territory', however ruled out the creation of a new start or union territory.

References

Geography of Nagaland